Enfield was a town in Hampshire County, Massachusetts. The town was lost as a result of the creation of the Quabbin Reservoir.

History
Incorporated in 1816 from portions of Greenwich and Belchertown. It was named in honor of one of its early settlers, Robert Field.  General Joseph Hooker, Union general during the American Civil War, was once a resident, and his grandfather was once a town leader.  It was centered at the junction of the east and west branches of the Swift River, and the Athol Branch of the Boston and Albany Railroad ran through the town.  The town bordered six other towns - Belchertown, Pelham, Greenwich, Prescott, Ware, and Hardwick.

Enfield was disincorporated on April 28, 1938 and portions of the town were annexed to the adjacent towns of Belchertown, New Salem, Pelham, and Ware.  (Not all of the former town is now in Hampshire County: the portion ceded to New Salem is now in Franklin County.)  The headquarters of the Metropolitan District Commission during the construction of the Quabbin Reservoir was located in the former town hall, and was the last building razed in the Swift River Valley, in 1940.  The majority of the town center now lies submerged beneath the reservoir, although the Quabbin Observatory and Enfield Lookout, located on scenic Quabbin Hill, as well as the main entrance and headquarters of Quabbin State Park, a popular tourist destination with an emphasis on state history and nature, are all within the former town's limits.

Enfield House, an on-campus living facility at Hampshire College in Amherst, Massachusetts, is named after the former town.

Enfield in popular culture

 Much of the novel Infinite Jest takes place in a city called Enfield, Mass.; David Foster Wallace has confirmed that he took the name from the town, but geographic cues make clear that the town in the novel is not the actual Enfield, and is instead a fictional stand-in for Brighton. The Enfield Tennis Academy and Ennet House, major locations in the novel, are located there.
 At the town's final ball, the band played Auld Lang Syne. When the song ended, the town became a part of Belchertown, Massachusetts.
 Mark Erelli's song "The Farewell Ball" (from the album Hillbilly Pilgrim) wistfully recalls the town's final ball from the perspective of a former resident of Enfield.
 Someday by Jackie French Koller is a children's book about the history of Enfield. It is about a girl who has to move from Enfield so they can flood the town to make a drinking water reservoir for Boston.

More Quabbin towns that were disincorporated
Dana
Greenwich
Prescott

Photos

References

Further reading

External links
https://web.archive.org/web/20161017095551/http://menotomymaps.com/quab_1.html. Map showing the towns buried under Quabbin as they looked in 1912 with original house locations and current reservoir water level

Defunct towns in Massachusetts
Submerged settlements in the United States
Populated places in Hampshire County, Massachusetts
Ghost towns in Massachusetts
1938 disestablishments in Massachusetts
1816 establishments in Massachusetts
Populated places established in 1816
Populated places disestablished in 1938